Barbara Blair (1911-1976) was an American actress on film and on stage. She played leading and supporting roles in several British films including The Outsider (1939).

Blair appeared on stage in New York, and in the musical comedy Take It Easy in London.

Blair married a London financier, becoming Barbara Blair Phillips.

Selected filmography
 Star of the Circus (1938)
 The Outsider (1939)
 Lucky to Me (1939)
 Bedelia (1946)
 Tall Headlines (1952)

References

Bibliography
 Goble, Alan. The Complete Index to Literary Sources in Film. Walter de Gruyter, 1999.

External links

1911 births
1976 deaths
American film actresses
American emigrants to the United Kingdom
20th-century American actresses